Diya is an actress.

Career
Diya was born into a Brahmin family in Hyderabad, and her family settled in Chennai when she was two years old. She trained as a dancer through lessons at the Kalakshetra Foundation, while also completing a bachelor's degree in psychology, a course in fashion technology, and a postgraduate course in computer science. Her first lead role came through Vishnuvardhan's Kurumbu (2003), and she subsequently played a similar glamorous role alongside Dhanush in Dreams (2004).

The actress was married in 2006 and subsequently opted out of the several unreleased projects she had committed to, including Seven, Sooravali and Century Raagam and thus ended her acting career. She married software engineer Aravind.

Filmography

References 

Living people
Actresses from Kolkata
Indian film actresses
21st-century Indian actresses
Actresses in Telugu cinema
Actresses in Tamil cinema
Place of birth missing (living people)
Actresses in Malayalam cinema
1985 births